Cameron Artigliere (born July 3, 1990 in Bamberg, Germany) is a German soccer player.

Biography

Early life
Artigliere is a Southern California native. San Fernando Valley-bred midfielder Cameron Artigliere (Winnetka/El Camino Real HS)  played in Dallas Cup, the top youth international football tournament for invited youth teams. In late 2008, he spent time playing in the lower leagues of Germany for SG Kaarst.

Career
Artigliere, who most recently played with German side Rheydter SV  Rheydter Spielverein. in 2008, he was invited to trial by 2. Bundesliga side Fortuna Düsseldorf. Artigliere recently returned to the U.S. after playing with Rheydter SV, based in Mönchengladbach, Germany. Artigliere made a move to Major League Soccer side Chivas USA in 2012. Making his debut for Chivas USA, Cameron Artigliere, came on for Ben Zemanski in the 69th minute in a 7-1 win over UC Riverside. After being released from the club 2012 Chivas USA, Artigliere signed with LA Galaxy feeder club FC Hasental. Artigliere was called on trial to train and play friendly games with the LA Galaxy reserve team. During his last game for FC Hasental, Cameron Artigliere would strike yet again. Artigliere fired a rocket on a free kick from 30 yards out to give FC Hasental a 2-0 lead over the Albion SC Pros in the 39th minute.

References

External links
 FC Hasental Profile
 Rheydter Spielverein Profile

Living people
1990 births
Soccer players from California
German footballers
Sportspeople from Bamberg
Association football forwards
Footballers from Bavaria